Garra incisorbis is a species of cyprinid fish in the genus Garra endemic to the Pearl River Basin in Guangxi, China.

References 

Garra
Fish described in 2016